Jean Strauss (17 February 1912 – 18 December 1989) was a Luxembourgian sprint canoeist who competed in the late 1930s. He finished 13th in the folding K-2 10000 m event at the 1936 Summer Olympics in Berlin.

References
Jean Strauss' profile at Sports Reference.com

1912 births
1989 deaths
Canoeists at the 1936 Summer Olympics
Luxembourgian male canoeists
Olympic canoeists of Luxembourg